The 11th Annual Japan Record Awards took place at the Imperial Garden Theater in Chiyoda, Tokyo, on December 31, 1969, starting at 7:00PM JST. The primary ceremonies were televised in Japan on TBS.

Award winners 
Japan Record Award
 Naomi Sagara (ja) for "Iijanai No Shiawase Naraba" (ja)
 Awarded New Artist at 2 years ago, 2nd award.
 Lyricist: Tokiko Iwatani
 Composer: Taku Izumi (ja)
 Arranger: Taku Izumi
 Record Company: JVCKenwood Victor Entertainment

Best Vocalist
 Shinichi Mori for "Minatomachi Blues" (ja)
 Lost to Naomi Sagara by one vote.

Best New Artist
 Peter for "Yoru To Asa No Aida Ni" (ja)

New Artist Award
 Norihiko Hashida and the Shoebelts for "Kaze" (ja)
 Hiroshi Uchiyamada and Cool Five for "Nagasaki Wa Kyō Mo Ame Datta" (ja)
 Kaoru Chiga (ja) for "Mayonaka No Guitar" (ja)
 Kyōko Takada (ja) for "Minna Yume No Naka" (ja)

Vocalist Award
 Mina Aoe for "Ikebukuro no Yoru" (ja)
Awarded again after last year, 2nd vocalist award.
 Mieko Hirota for "Ningyō no Ie" (ja)
 Tokiko Kato for "Hitorine No Komori Uta"

General Public Award
 Kiyoko Suizenji for "365 Step's March" (ja) & "Jinjitsu Ichiro No March"
 Ryoko Moriyama for "Kinjireta Koi" (ja)

Lyricist Award
 Michio Yamagami (ja) for "Yoake no Scat"
 Singer: Saori Yuki

Composer Award
 Kyōhei Tsutsumi for "Blue Light Yokohama" (ja)
 Singer: Ayumi Ishida

Arranger Award
 Shinzō Teraoka (ja) for "Kanashimi Wa Kake Ashi De Yatte Kuru"
 Singer: Mariko Ann
 Awarded again after 5 years, 2nd arranger award.

Planning Award
 EMI Music Japan
 Awarded again after 3 years, 3rd planning award.

Children's Song Award
 Three Bubbles for "Umareta Kyō Dai 11-nin"

Special Award
 Takao Saeki (ja)
 EMI Music Japan

Other Performers

Guests
 Jun Mayuzumi (Last year's Japan Record Award winner, give trophy to Naomi Sagara.)
 Yoichi Sugawara (Last year's vocalist award winner, give trophy to Mori Shinichi.)
 Pinky & Killers (Last year's new artist award winner, give trophy to Peter and banquet to Naomi Sagara.)
 Yukio Hashi
 Hibari Misora

Dancers
 Studio No.1 Dancers
 BM Dancers

Chorus
 Cole Acacia
 Wakakusa Children's Chorus

References

External links

Japan Record Awards
Japan Record Awards
Japan Record Awards
Japan Record Awards
1969